Achimenes erecta (syn. A. coccinea) is also known as Cupid's bower, nut orchid, and magic flower. Despite its name, Achimenes erecta, this plant is a trailing achimenes. It produces a display of bright red flowers and dark green foliage. The reddish green stem carries groups of hairy, heart-shaped leaves. The flowers last only a few days, but are produced over a period lasting all the way from June to October.

References

External links

Gesnerioideae
Plants described in 1786